Transtar may refer to:

 Transtar, Inc., a transportation subsidiary of U.S. Steel
 Transtar Airlines (Orlando, 1992–1993), an American airline company
 TranStar Airlines (Houston, 1986–1987), an American airline company
 TranStar Racing, an American automotive group
 Transtar Radio Networks, a music programming service
 International Transtar, a model of International Harvester truck
 Houston TranStar, which provides traffic and emergency management in Greater Houston
 Trans*, an umbrella term for transgender and transsexual

See also
 StarTran, the public transit bus system in Lincoln, Nebraska, United States